The 72nd Brigade was an infantry brigade formation of  the British Army in the First World War and the Second World War.

First World War

Formation and Service
It was raised as part of the new army (Kitchener's Army) and assigned to the 24th Division and served on the Western Front during the First World War.

The brigade was disbanded after the war.

Order of battle
During the First World War the following units served in the 72nd Brigade.
 8th (Service) Battalion, Queen's (Royal West Surrey Regiment) (to 17th Brigade in February 1918)
 8th (Service) Battalion, Buffs (East Kent Regiment) (to 17th Brigade in October 1915)
 9th (Service) Battalion, East Surrey Regiment
 8th (Service) Battalion, Queen's Own (Royal West Kent Regiment)
 1st Battalion, Prince of Wales's (North Staffordshire Regiment) (from 17th Brigade in October 1915)
 72nd Machine Gun Company 	
 72nd Trench Mortar Battery

Second World War

Formation and Service

In January 1941, the 72nd Independent Infantry Brigade was formed. In 1943, the Brigade HQ was re-designated the 5th Parachute Brigade after its units were dispersed. A new 72nd Infantry Brigade was formed on 28 April 1944 from the 72nd Indian Infantry Brigade which was renamed and joined the 36th Infantry Division.

Order of battle
During the Second World War the following units served in the Brigade.
As the 72nd Independent Infantry Brigade
 13th Battalion, Royal Welch Fusiliers (21 January 1941 — 24 September 1942)
 6th Battalion, Royal Inniskilling Fusiliers (21 January 1941 — 14 January 1942)
 15th Battalion, South Staffordshire Regiment (21 January 1941 — 25 May 1942)
 4th Battalion, East Lancashire Regiment (14 January 1942 — 8 October 1942)
 11th Battalion, Devonshire Regiment (8 October 1941 — 25 May 1943)
 9th Battalion, Somerset Light Infantry (9 September 1942 — 21 May 1943)
As the 72nd Infantry Brigade in India
6th Battalion, South Wales Borderers (28 April 1944 — 18 July 1945)
10th Battalion, Gloucestershire Regiment (28 April 1944 — 31 August 1945)
9th Battalion, Royal Sussex Regiment (28 April 1944 — 31 August 1945)

References

Bibliography

 
 

Infantry brigades of the British Army in World War I
Infantry brigades of the British Army in World War II